Cool It Reba was an American band from New York City, that was part of the downtown post-punk/no wave scene in the early 1980s. Their music combined elements of James Brown funk, Television's guitar interplay and David Byrne's lyrical paranoia to a danceable beat.

The name came from a catch phrase that Soupy Sales often said on his show.

The band was formed in the Autumn of 1981 by vocalist/guitarist David Hansen, who was previously a member of Rhode Island's The Young Adults, and drummer Kevin Tooley who was in The Mundanes. The original line-up was completed by John Fredericks on lead guitar and bassist Baker Rorick (who later played in The Baxters, The Scarecrows and Purple K'niF).

They regularly played such venues as CBGB's, The Peppermint Lounge, The Mudd Club and Danceteria NYC. After only their fourth gig they signed to Hannibal Records in 1982. Shortly thereafter, they released the Joe Boyd-produced Money Fall Out The Sky EP. Containing such songs as "I Saw Snakes", "Out Where The Buses Don't Run" and the title track, it was met with critical acclaim, making many critics' annual top-ten lists.

The band then played alongside the likes of Billy Idol, John Cale and R.E.M. Label restaffing and losing key members led to the ultimate breakup of the band in the summer of 1984, although half of the band members later played together in the band Steve McQueen. Although Cool It Reba only released one record during their existence, many bootlegs of their live shows and unreleased studio recordings have circulated.

Discography 
Money Fall Out The Sky, 1982, Hannibal Records

Original members 
David Hansen (lead vocals, rhythm guitar)
John Fredericks (lead guitar, vocals)
Baker Rorick (bass)
Kevin Tooley (drums, percussion)

Later members 
Gordon Wands (bass 1983-84)
John McCurry (lead guitar 1983)
Sid McGinnis (lead guitar 1983)
Jack Rigg (lead guitar 1984)
Sturgis Nikides (lead guitar 1984)

External links 
Cool It Reba Resource center blog Photos, reviews, listings, articles and various things.
Cool It Reba Myspace Page containing photos, reviews and listings.
Yahoo Groups Page for Cool It Reba reviews, lyrics, gigography, photos and all Reba-related artists.
Review of 2/13/82 Lupo's Show The Providence Journal February 15, 1982 Page B-04 By Tony Lioce.
Village Voice Review Robert Christgau's review.
Review of 1/7/84 Peppermint Lounge show The New York Times January 9, 1984 C14 By Jon Pareles.
The Dean's List The Village Voice's 1983 Pazz & Jop Poll.
Cool It Reba Guitarist Jack Rigg Turns Doctor The Fort Gordon Signal July 30, 2010.

No wave groups
Rock music groups from New York (state)
American new wave musical groups